Sudan competed at the 2012 Summer Olympics in London, from 27 July to 12 August 2012. This was the nation's eleventh appearance at the Olympics, since its debut in 1960. Sudan, however, did not attend the 1976 Summer Olympics in Montreal and the 1980 Summer Olympics in Moscow because of the African and the United States boycott. 

Six Sudanese athletes were selected to the team, competing only in track and field and in swimming. Middle-distance runner and Olympic silver medalist Ismail Ahmed Ismail was the nation's flag bearer at the opening ceremony. For the first time since 2004, Sudan failed to win a single Olympic medal. Double world indoor champion Abubaker Kaki missed out of the nation's another Olympic medal, finishing farther from the standings.

Athletics

Sudanese athletes have so far achieved qualifying standards in the following athletics events (up to a maximum of 3 athletes in each event at the 'A' Standard, and 1 at the 'B' Standard):

Key
 Note – Ranks given for track events are within the athlete's heat only
 Q = Qualified for the next round
 q = Qualified for the next round as a fastest loser or, in field events, by position without achieving the qualifying target
 NR = National record
 N/A = Round not applicable for the event
 Bye = Athlete not required to compete in round

Men

Women

Swimming

Sudan has gained two "Universality places" from the FINA.

Men

Women

References

External links

Nations at the 2012 Summer Olympics
2012
2012 in Sudanese sport